The 2013–14 Alabama Crimson Tide women's basketball team represents the University of Alabama in the 2013–14 college basketball season. The Crimson Tide, led by first year head coach Kristy Curry, played their games at Foster Auditorium and are members of the Southeastern Conference.

Roster

Schedule

|-
!colspan=9| Exhibition

|-
!colspan=9| Regular Season

|-
!colspan=9| 2014 SEC women's basketball tournament

Source

See also
2013–14 Alabama Crimson Tide men's basketball team

References

Alabama
Alabama Crimson Tide women's basketball seasons
Alabama Crimson Tide
Alabama Crimson Tide